Hall Island is a small island located  to the northwest of St. Matthew Island in the Bering Sea in Alaska, United States. It serves as a haulout site for Pacific walrus. Hall Island is uninhabited. It is part of the Bering Sea unit of the Alaska Maritime National Wildlife Refuge. It is one of three hall islands.

History
Early Russian hunters knew this island as "Ostrov Morzhovoy" ('Walrus Island') (Tevenkov, 1852, mpa 20). The Imperial Russian Hydrographic Department Chart 1427 called it "Ostrov Sindsha" probably for Lt. Sind, its alleged discoverer, in 1764.

Commodore Joseph Billings of the Imperial Russian Navy and Lt. Gavril Sarychev anchored between this island and St. Matthew on July 14, 1791 (O.S.). Since 1875, this island has been called "Hall" on American maps, presumably for Lt. Robert Hall, who was with Captain Billings, or also for Cape Hall.

Gallery

See also
List of mountain peaks of North America
List of mountain peaks of the United States
List of mountain peaks of Alaska

References

 Hall Island: Block 1047, Census Tract 1, Bethel Census Area, Alaska United States Census Bureau
 
 Birdlife

External links

Islands of the Bering Sea
Islands of Alaska
Islands of Bethel Census Area, Alaska
Alaska Maritime National Wildlife Refuge
Protected areas of Bethel Census Area, Alaska
Uninhabited islands of Alaska
Islands of Unorganized Borough, Alaska